Heinz Karner (born 24 November 1974) is an Austrian football manager.

References

1974 births
Living people
Austrian football managers
Grazer AK managers
DSV Leoben managers